Vestfold Hospital Trust ( HF) is a public health trust which serves Vestfold, Norway. Its main facility is Tønsberg Hospital, which supplements divisions in Larvik and Stavern. As of 2019, the hospital had 5,400 employees. The hospital was founded in 1870. It was merged with Horten Hospital, originally the Navy Hospital, established in 1828, in 1998, and merged with Sandefjord Hospital and Larvik Hospital in 2000, and with the Psychiatry of Vestfold Trust in 2012. It is owned by the Norwegian state through Southern and Eastern Norway Regional Health Authority.

The hospital was established as Jarlsberg and Larvik County Hospital (Jarlsberg og Larvik amts sygehus). It was renamed Vestfold County Hospital (Vestfold fylkessykehus) in 1918 and was significantly extended during Nikolai Nissen Paus' tenure as director (1918–1947). It was later renamed Vestfold Central Hospital (Vestfold sentralsykehus) and to the current Vestfold Hospital (Sykehuset i Vestfold) in 2002.

External links
Official website

Health trusts of Norway
Hospitals established in 1870
Buildings and structures in Vestfold og Telemark
Tønsberg
Larvik
Sandefjord
Horten
1870 establishments in Norway